Three ships of the Royal Navy have been named HMS Cassandra after Cassandra, of Greek mythology. A fourth was planned, but never completed:

HMS Cassandra was to have been a 36-gun fifth rate. She was ordered in 1782 but cancelled later that year.
  was a 10-gun cutter launched in 1806. She foundered in 1807.
  was a  light cruiser launched in 1916 and sunk by a mine in 1918. 
  was a  destroyer, originally planned as HMS Tourmaline but renamed in 1942 and launched in 1943. She was scrapped in 1967.

Royal Navy ship names